North of South may refer to:

Music 

 North of South (band), a Spanish metal band

Books 

 North of South, a travel book